Muff is an unincorporated community in Armstrong County, Pennsylvania, United States. The highest natural point in Armstrong County is located near Muff.

A post office called Muff was established in 1879, and remained in operation until it was discontinued in 1908. A variant name is "Snyderville".

References

Unincorporated communities in Armstrong County, Pennsylvania
Unincorporated communities in Pennsylvania